Brainstorm generally refers to brainstorming, a group or individual creativity exercise.

The term originally referred to a state of temporary insanity, gaining prominence when it was used in the defense of Harry Kendall Thaw against charges that he murdered prominent architect Stanford White (1907–1908).

Brainstorm may also refer to:

Film
 Brainstorm (1965 film), directed by William Conrad
 Brainstorm (1983 film), directed by Douglas Trumbull
 Brainstorm (2000 film), Brazilian film directed by Laís Bodanzky, also known as Bicho de Sete Cabeças
 Brainstorm, alternate title of the 2002 movie Cypher

Music

Artists
 Brainstorm (Latvian band), a pop/rock band
 Brainstorm (German band), a power metal band
 Brainstorm (American band), a funk and R&B band
 Brainstorm, a rapper with Brothers Grym
 Brainstorm, one of the pseudonyms used by the musician Moby

Albums
 Brainstorm (album), a 1991 album by rapper Young MC
 Brainstorm (EP), the first extended play by Disney star Mitchel Musso
 Brainstorm (The Osmonds album), a 1976 album by The Osmonds

Songs
 "Brainstorm", a song by Hawkwind from their 1972 album Doremi Fasol Latido
 "Brainstorm", a song by Kevin Ayers from his 2007 album The Unfairground
 "Brainstorm", a song by Morbid Angel from their 1991 album Blessed Are the Sick
 "Brainstorming / Kimi Sae Ireba Nani mo Iranai", a song by the Japanese female idol group Morning Musume

Fictional characters
 Brainstorm (Transformers), an Autobot Headmaster in the Transformers fiction
 Brainstorm (Ben 10), an alien in the Ben 10 animated television series
 Brain Storm (comics), a villain from DC Comics
 Valeria Meghan Von Doom (formerly Valeria Richards), a young hero in the Marvel Comics series The Fantastic Four

Other uses
 Brainstorm (TV series), a BBC television comedy quiz
 Brainstorm (board game), a quiz-style board game
 Brainstorm (magazine), a trade publication for the South African technology sector

See also
 Brainstorms, a 1981 book by Daniel Dennett
 "Brianstorm", a 2007 single by the Arctic Monkeys
 Professor Branestawm, a character in the novels of Norman Hunter